"Colours" is a song by the American indie rock band Grouplove. It is the fourth track from their first album Never Trust a Happy Song, and also appeared on their first EP, Grouplove. The song was the first single released from the album, on July 7, 2011, with a music video. The song was produced by Ryan Rabin.

Foster the People released a remix of the song via RCRD LBL in 2011.

Music video
The music video for "Colours" was released on January 4, 2011. It shows the lead singer, Christian Zucconi, being hanged from a tree before the other band members attack, dressed as Native Americans.

Track listing

Charts

References

2011 singles
Grouplove songs
2011 songs
Song articles with missing songwriters
Songs written by Ryan Rabin